The 2018 end of year rugby union tests, also referred to as the Autumn internationals in the Northern Hemisphere, were a number of rugby union test matches played during October and November, primarily involving countries from the Northern Hemisphere hosting those from the Southern Hemisphere. Also involved in matches are those from second-tier teams. These international games count towards World Rugby's ranking system, with a team typically playing from two to four matches during this period.

Matches

October

Notes:
 Sonny Bill Williams (New Zealand) earned his 50th test cap.
 Sekope Kepu (Australia) became the ninth Australian to earn his 100th test cap and the first in his position for his country.
 New Zealand completed a 3-0 whitewashing of Australia for the first time since 2016.

2/3 November

Notes:
 Hiroshi Yamashita (Japan) earned his 50th test cap.
 Jamie Henry, Isileli Nakajima (both Japan), George Bridge, Brett Cameron, Mitchell Drummond, Gareth Evans, Dillon Hunt, Tyrel Lomax, Dalton Papalii and Matt Proctor (all New Zealand) made their international debuts.
 New Zealand gave debuts to eight players, their highest number since 1986 when 11 players debuted against France.
 Japan's 31 points was their highest score against New Zealand, surpassing the 17 points scored in 1995.

Notes:
 Jarrod Evans, Luke Morgan (both Wales) and Darcy Graham (Scotland) made their international debuts.
 Wales won the first ever contest of the Doddie Weir Cup.
 Wales won their opening 'Autumn Internationals' match for the first time since beating Romania 40–3 in 2002, and they gained their first opening win at the Millennium Stadium since beating Samoa 50–6 in 2000.

Notes:
 Zach Mercer and Ben Moon (both England) made their international debuts.
 With this win and the 25–10 victory in June 2018, England won back-to-back matches against South Africa for the first time since their November 2004 and 2006 victories.

Notes:
 Ross Byrne, Will Addison (both Ireland), Jimmy Tuivaiti and Johan Meyer (both Italy) made their international debuts.

5–10 November

Notes:
 Roman Khodin, Dmitry Perov, Daniil Potikhanov (all Russia), Janry du Toit, Prince ǃGaoseb and Adriaan Ludick (all Namibia) made their international debuts.
 Yuri Kushnarev became the first Russian player to earn 100 caps.
 Evgeny Matveev (Russia) earned his 50th test cap.
 This was the first meeting between the two nations hosted by Russia.

Notes:
 This was the first meeting between the two nations since 2003.
 Zurab Dzneladze (Georgia) made his international debut.

Notes:
 Sam Skinner (Scotland), Mesulame Dolokoto and Setariki Tuicuvu (both Fiji) made their international debuts.

Notes:
 New Zealand retained the Hillary Shield.

Notes:
 This was Wales' first win over Australia since their 21–18 victory in 2008, ending a 13-match winning streak for Australia over the Welsh, to claim the James Bevan Trophy.

Notes:
 David Ainuu, Devereaux Ferris, Gannon Moore (all United States), Raymond Niuia and Ben Nee-Nee (both Samoa) made their international debuts.
 This was the United States' first win over Samoa, winning their first test against a Pacific Nation since May 1999.

Notes:
 Joaquín Díaz Bonilla, Rodrigo Bruni and Lucio Sordoni (all Argentina) made their international debuts.
 Ireland retained the Admiral Brown Cup.

Notes:
 This was the first match played by the Māori All Blacks in South America since touring Argentina in 1988.
 Matteo Dell’Acqua and Devon Müller (both Brazil) made their international debuts.

16/17 November

Notes:
 Tudor Boldor, Marius Iftimiciuc, Alexandru Savin (all Romania) and Nick Boyer (United States) made their international debuts.
 With this win, and Italy's loss to Australia, USA move to 13th on the World Rugby Rankings, their highest ever position.
 The United States reclaim the Pershing Cup, who had held it since the teams' previous meeting in 2016.

Notes:
 Manuel Ardao, Guillermo Pujadas (both Uruguay) and Eroni Sau (Fiji) made their international debuts.

Notes:
 Jake Gordon (Australia) made his international debut.

Notes:
 Tedo Abzhandadze, Beka Gigashvili and Guram Gogichashvili (all Georgia) made their international debuts.
 Tamaz Mchedlidze (Georgia) earned his 50th test cap.

Notes:
 Jonah Holmes (Wales) and Maʻafu Fia (Tonga) made their international debuts.
 Liam Williams (Wales) earned his 50th test cap.
 This was Wales' biggest winning margin over Tonga, surpassing the 44-point difference set in 2001.

Notes:
 Mickael de Marco, Tobias Francis, Lucas Levy, Lucas Rubio, Richard Stewart (all Spain), Jason Benade, Henrique Olivier, Chad Plato and Wihan von Wielligh (all Namibia) made their international debuts.

Notes:
 Joe Cokanasiga and Ted Hill (both England) made their international debuts.
 George Ford (England) earned his 50th test cap.
 This was the first meeting between the two teams to be held in England, and outside of a Rugby World Cup.

Notes:
 Augusto Böhme, Tomás Contreras and Marcelo Torrealba (all Chile) made their international debuts.

Notes:
 This was Ireland's first home win over New Zealand.

Notes:
 Mathieu Bastareaud, Rabah Slimani (both France), Julián Montoya and Javier Ortega Desio (both Argentina) earned their 50th test caps.

24 November

1 December

See also
 2018 mid-year rugby union internationals
 2019 Rugby World Cup qualification – Repechage

References

2018
End-of-year rugby union internationals
End-of-year rugby union internationals
End-of-year rugby union internationals
End-of-year rugby union internationals
End-of-year rugby union internationals
October 2018 sports events in Asia
October 2018 sports events in Europe
November 2018 sports events in Europe
November 2018 sports events in South America
December 2018 sports events in Europe